Tsing Lung Bridge (青龍大橋) is a proposed suspension bridge in Hong Kong, from North Lantau to Tsing Lung Tau, in the western New Territories, between Tsuen Wan and Tuen Mun, forming part of the Route 10 North Lantau to Yuen Long Highway. The bridge and highway have not been constructed. At the time of its announcement in 2002, it would have been the world's 4th-longest suspension bridge, with a main span of  - 41 metres longer than the Tsing Ma Bridge. Detailed planning was then complete and construction was due to commence in 2003 and be open to traffic in 2008.

See also 
 List of longest suspension bridge spans
 List of tunnels and bridges in Hong Kong

References 

Route 10 (Hong Kong)
Landmarks in Hong Kong
Suspension bridges in Hong Kong